In functional analysis and related areas of mathematics, the beta-dual or -dual is a certain linear subspace of the algebraic dual of a sequence space.

Definition 

If  is an FK-space then each  in  defines a continuous linear form on

Examples

Properties 
If  is an FK-AK space then the beta dual is linear isomorphic to the continuous dual.

Functional analysis